The national emblem of Mozambique was adopted in 1990 in the Constitution of Mozambique article 194. The article clearly states the design and meaning of the device. It shows a gear wheel, bordered by corn stalks and sugarcane. In the middle there is a red sun over a map of Mozambique in green, and blue waves, an AK-47 crossed with a hoe, and a book. The wreath is tied with a ribbon bearing the name of the country. The emblem is "socialist heraldry" style similar to those of the Soviet republics.

Description 
As described in the Mozambican constitution article 194, the various parts of the emblem have a special symbolism, i.e.
 the corn stalk and the sugar cane represent agricultural wealth
 the cog wheel represents labor and industry
 the book represents education
 the hoe for "peasantry and agriculture production"
 the AK-47, with a bayonet attached, for "defense and vigilance"
 the red star represents the spirit of international solidarity of the Mozambican people".
 the red sun symbolizes the building of a new life

From 1975-1982, the map of Mozambique was brown instead of green. Along with this change of colour, the position of the wreath was changed, the text was changed from black to gold, and a gold border was added around the red star.

In 1990, with the implementation of the new constitution, the name of the country was changed from República Popular de Moçambique to República de Moçambique, and the text on the emblem was changed accordingly.

Mozambique's parliamentary opposition would specifically like to see removed the image of the Kalashnikov assault rifle, which symbolizes the nation's struggle for independence, according to press reports.

Historical coats of arms
In 1935, the Portuguese colonies were officially assigned coats of arms that followed a standard design pattern.

References

Article 194
The emblem of the Republic of Mozambique shall contain as its central elements a book, a gun and a hoe, superimposed on a map of Mozambique, representing, respectively, education, defense and vigilance, and the peasantry and agricultural production.
Below the map the ocean shall be represented.
In the center shall be the rising sun, symbol of the building of a new life.
Enclosing all this shall be a toothed wheel, symbolizing labor and industry.
Surrounding the toothed wheel there shall be, to the right and left respectively, an ear of maize and a piece of sugar cane, symbolizing agricultural wealth.
At the bottom there shall be a red strip with the inscription "Republic of Mozambique." 

National symbols of Mozambique
Mosambique
Mozambique
Mozambique
Mozambique
Mozambique
Mozambique
Mozambique
Mozambique
Mozambique
Mozambique
Mozambique